Wabern may refer to:

Wabern, Hesse - a community in the Schwalm-Eder district in northern Hesse, Germany
Wabern, Bern - a village in the Köniz municipality in the canton of Bern, Switzerland